María Pérez may refer to:

 María Pérez Balteira (fl. 13th-century), Galician composer and singer
 María Irigoyen Pérez (born 1952), Spanish member of the European Parliament
 María Angélica Pérez (1897–1932), Argentine Roman Catholic nun
 María Paulina Pérez (born 1996), Colombian tennis player
 María Pérez Fernández (born 1987), Spanish footballer
 María Pérez (footballer) (born 1992), Cuban footballer
 María Pérez (racewalker) (born 1996), Spanish racewalker
 María Belén Pérez Maurice (born 1985), Argentine fencer
 María Pérez (judoka) (born 1989), Puerto Rican judoka
 María Pérez (swimmer) (born 1962), Venezuelan Olympic swimmer
 María José Pérez (volleyball) (born 1988), Venezuelan volleyball player
 María José Pérez (runner) (born 1992), Spanish runner
 María José Pérez González (born 1984), Spanish footballer
 Maria Perez (journalist), American journalist for the Naples Daily News; see List of George Polk Award winners